Sergei Vladimirovich Budylin (born 31 October 1979) is a former Russian footballer.

He is a brother of Yuri Budylin.

External links
 

1979 births
Living people
People from Nizhnekamsk
Russian footballers
Association football midfielders
PFC Krylia Sovetov Samara players
FC Torpedo Moscow players
FC Rubin Kazan players
Russian Premier League players
FC KAMAZ Naberezhnye Chelny players
FC Orenburg players
FC Neftekhimik Nizhnekamsk players
Sportspeople from Tatarstan